Gaohu is a town in  Hengdong County in southeastern Hunan province, China, located  southeast of the county seat and served by G72 Quanzhou–Nanning Expressway. , it has one residential community and 10 villages under its administration.

See also 
 List of township-level divisions of Hunan

References

External links 

Towns of Hunan
Hengdong County